John Charles Field-Richards (10 May 1878 – 18 April 1959) was a British Army officer and motorboat racer who competed in the 1908 Summer Olympics.

Biography
Field-Richards studied at Keble College, Oxford. He joined the Hampshire Regiment as Second lieutenant on 19 May 1900, and was promoted to Lieutenant on 10 January 1902.

As crew member of the Gyrinus he won two gold medals in the only motorboat competitions at the Olympics.

External links

External links
profile

1878 births
1959 deaths
British motorboat racers
Olympic motorboat racers of Great Britain
Motorboat racers at the 1908 Summer Olympics
English Olympic medallists
Olympic gold medallists for Great Britain
Alumni of Keble College, Oxford
Medalists at the 1908 Summer Olympics